Juozas Olekas (born 30 October 1955) is a Lithuanian surgeon and politician, a former Minister of National Defence, from 2006 to 2008. In 1990 and from 2003 to 2004 he also served as the Health Minister. In 2019 he was elected to the European Parliament.

Olekas studied at Kaunas Institute of Medicine from 1974 to 1976, and at Vilnius University from 1976 to 1980.

Between 1994 and 1997 he was a chief physician at the Vilnius University hospital.

Olekas is married to Aurelija Olekienė, they have two daughters.

References

External links

 Biography at the Ministry of National Defence
 Biography at the Lithuanian government website 

1955 births
Health ministers of Lithuania
Lithuanian surgeons
Living people
Ministers of Defence of Lithuania
Vilnius University alumni
Members of the Seimas
21st-century Lithuanian politicians
MEPs for Lithuania 2019–2024
Recipients of the Order of the Cross of Terra Mariana, 2nd Class